Jet2 plc (formerly Dart Group plc) is a British multinational airline company based in Leeds, England.

Its head office is located in the Low Fare Finder House on the grounds of Leeds Bradford Airport, England. Subsidiary Jet2.com has its head office in the same building.

The company's name for most of its existence was derived from the type of aircraft that it first flew, the Handley Page Dart Herald. After selling off other units, the company rebranded as Jet2 in 2020. The stock ticker symbol also changed to Jet2 to reflect the name change,

History

Leased aircraft
The company's operations originated in 1971 when Art Carpenter formed two companies: Carpenter's Air Services Ltd to fly flowers using contracted aircraft to the UK mainland from Guernsey; and Carpenter's Transport to distribute the flowers on the UK mainland to wholesale markets. In 1975, these two companies became Express Air Freight.

Purchase of aircraft
In 1978, the company purchased Handley Page Dart Herald aircraft to fly flowers and fresh produce from the Channel Islands to Bournemouth Airport, and consumer goods from the UK via Bournemouth to the Channel Islands. In 1979, it became Express Air Services and flew contracts for the Royal Mail to the Channel Islands from Bournemouth, Bristol and Liverpool from 1980.

Purchase by Philip Meeson
In 1983, the company changed its name to identify with its regional route, becoming three companies under the Channel Express name, which had the air freight, running of the two Dart Herald aircraft, and the distribution within the UK as separate operations. It was purchased in 1983 by Philip Meeson, becoming Channel Express Group. It was split into Aviation Services and Distribution divisions. In 1985 a third Dart Herald aircraft was bought, which flew an overnight parcels service from Birmingham Airport to Nuremberg and Hanover.

Flotation
Channel Express Group Ltd floated on the UK's Unlisted Securities Market (USM) and had seven Super Dart Herald aircraft. In 1989 it bought the first of three Lockheed Electra aircraft, as well as having nine Super Dart Herald aircraft. In 1991, the company changed its name to Dart Group plc and floated on the London Stock Exchange.

Fowler Welch
In 1994 it purchased the Spalding-based company Fowler Welch, a temperature-controlled distribution company. The first of seven Fokker F27 aircraft was purchased in 1994. Its airline group, Channel Express (Air Services) bought its first 257-seater Airbus A-300B4 in 1996. It was converted to become a freighter at BAE Systems in Filton. A southern distribution centre was built in Portsmouth in 1999 under the Channel Express name. The Coolchain distribution company in Kent was bought in 1999. By 2000 the company had 1,500 employees and two divisions (air and freight distribution). In 2001, two Boeing 737 aircraft were purchased with a quick-change facility allowing a freight aircraft to transform into a passenger aircraft in only 30 minutes.

On 1 June 2020 it was confirmed that Dart Group PLC had sold Fowler Welch for £98 million to Culina Group Limited.

Jet2.com
In 2002, four Boeing 737 aircraft were purchased with two becoming 737 QC (Quick change) aircraft and two as passenger aircraft. From February 2003, the Jet2 low-cost airline began flying from Leeds Bradford Airport to mainland Europe destinations. Fowler-Welch and Coolchain merged to become Fowler-Welch Coolchain Ltd in 2003. Eight Boeing 737-300 aircraft (of which five were passenger aircraft) were purchased in 2003 to bring the total to 12. In 2004, six more Boeing 737-300 passenger aircraft were purchased, and routes from Belfast International Airport started in April and from Manchester Airport in December. In 2005, routes began from Newcastle Airport in October and two Boeing 757-200 aircraft were purchased. In 2006, six more Boeing 757-200 passenger aircraft were bought and the Channel Express Portsmouth distribution base was sold to Ferryspeed C.I. Ltd in June. A package holiday company, Jet2holidays, was formed in January 2007.

Corporate Affairs 
Below is the financial information of Jet2 plc and its predecessor Dart Group plc:

Operations

The company has the Jet2.com low cost airline that has its headquarters on the grounds of Leeds Bradford Airport, along with its subsidiary Jet2holidays. The airline operates from 10 UK bases, such as Leeds Bradford International, Newcastle International Airport, Edinburgh Airport, Manchester Airport, Glasgow Airport, Belfast International Airport, East Midlands Airport, Birmingham Airport, London Stansted Airport and Bristol Airport. They also have 3 overseas bases,  Alicante Airport, Palma de Mallorca Airport and Tenerife South Airport.

See also

 Jet2.com destinations

References

External links
 

Companies based in Leeds
Holding companies established in 1991
Defunct shipping companies of the United Kingdom
Logistics companies of the United Kingdom
Transport in Guernsey
1991 establishments in England
Companies listed on the Alternative Investment Market
British companies established in 1991